Gangtok Municipal Corporation is the municipal corporation governing Indian city of Gangtok.

History 
The first-ever historic elections of the Gangtok Municipal Corporation consisting of 15 wards, was held on 27 April 2010. The councilors took the oath of allegiance to their offices on 12 May 2010. Elections to the post of Mayor and Deputy Mayor were held on the same day. K. N. Topgay and Shakti Singh Choudhary were elected as the First Mayor and First Deputy Mayor of the Gangtok Municipal Corporation respectively. The first phase of the three Fs (functions, functionaries, and funds) depending on the capacity of the corporation was devolved to the corporation vide Gazette Notification No 293, dated 25 June 2010.

Administration 
The Municipal Corporation is divided into 19 administrative wards. It consists of democratically elected members (councillors) and is headed by the Mayor. The councillors are chosen through direct election by all the voters residing in the administrative ward for a term of 5 years. Although the Municipal Corporation is the legislative body that lays down policies for the governance of the city, it is the Municipal Commissioner who is responsible for the execution of the policies. The Municipal Commissioner, appointed by the state government, is the head of the executive arm of the corporation and is assisted by various other officers belonging to different departments in the corporation.

References 

Gangtok
Municipal corporations in Sikkim